Erika Alves de Moura (born 23 November 1987), commonly known as Erikinha, is a Brazilian footballer who plays as an attacking midfielder for Santos FC.

Club career
Erikinha was born in São Paulo, and began his career with Santos in 2007. She left the club in December 2011 to move abroad, and joined South Korean side Suwon FMC for the 2012 campaign.

In 2013, Erikinha returned to his home country to join Ferroviária, but moved to Austria's SKN St. Pölten in the following year. In August 2015, after a period of trainings at São José-SP and another spell at Ferroviária, she returned to Santos.

On 11 December 2018, Erikinha and Santos teammate Brena moved to Norwegian side Avaldsnes IL. After featuring rarely, she returned to Peixe for a third spell on 20 January 2020.

Honours
Santos
Copa Libertadores Femenina: 2009, 2010
Copa do Brasil de Futebol Feminino: 2009
Campeonato Brasileiro de Futebol Feminino Série A1: 2017
Campeonato Paulista de Futebol Feminino: 2018
Copa Paulista de Futebol Feminino: 2020

Ferroviária
Campeonato Paulista de Futebol Feminino: 2013

References

1987 births
Living people
Footballers from São Paulo
Brazilian women's footballers
Women's association football midfielders
Campeonato Brasileiro de Futebol Feminino Série A1 players
Santos FC (women) players
Associação Ferroviária de Esportes (women) players
Suwon FC Women players
Toppserien players
Avaldsnes IL players
Expatriate women's footballers in South Korea
Expatriate women's footballers in Norway
Brazilian expatriate women's footballers
Brazilian expatriate sportspeople in South Korea
Brazilian expatriate sportspeople in Austria
Brazilian expatriate sportspeople in Norway
SKN St. Pölten players